Justin Lawrence (born March 14, 1996) is a professional Canadian football offensive lineman for the Montreal Alouettes of the Canadian Football League (CFL).

University career
Lawrence played U Sports football for the Alberta Golden Bears from 2014 to 2017.

Professional career

Calgary Stampeders
Lawrence was drafted in the fifth round, 39th overall, by the Calgary Stampeders in the 2018 CFL Draft and signed with the team on May 14, 2018. He dressed in his first professional game in the team's 2018 season opener on June 16, 2018 against the Hamilton Tiger-Cats. He dressed in six regular season games in 2018 and was on the practice roster when the Calgary Stampeders won the 106th Grey Cup. 

In the 2019 season, Lawrence dressed in all 18 regular season games where he started six games at centre and one game at left guard. He also played in his first post-season game which was a West Semi-Final loss to the Winnipeg Blue Bombers. After the season, on December 5, 2019, he signed a two-year extension with the Stampeders. He became a free agent upon the expiry of his contract on February 8, 2022.

Toronto Argonauts
On February 8, 2022, it was announced that Lawrence had signed with the Toronto Argonauts. In 2022, he played in 18 regular season games and started in 17 while making the shift to centre. Near the end of season, he was named a Division All-Star for the first time in his career. Lawrence started at centre in the 109th Grey Cup game and won his second Grey Cup championship as the Argonauts defeated the Winnipeg Blue Bombers 24–23. He became a free agent on February 14, 2023.

Montreal Alouettes
On February 14, 2023, it was announced that Lawrence had signed with the Montreal Alouettes.

References

External links
 Montreal Alouettes bio

1996 births
Living people
Alberta Golden Bears football players
Calgary Stampeders players
Canadian football offensive linemen
Players of Canadian football from Alberta
Canadian football people from Edmonton
Toronto Argonauts players
Montreal Alouettes players